Early general elections under a new electoral law were held in Tonga on 25 November 2010. They determined the composition of the 2010 Tongan Legislative Assembly.

The early elections were announced by the new King George Tupou V in July 2008 shortly before being crowned on 1 August 2008, and were preceded by a programme of constitutional reform. For the first time, a majority of the seats (17 out of 26) in the Tongan parliament were elected by universal suffrage, with the remaining nine seats being reserved for members of Tonga's nobility. This marked a major progression away from the 165-year rule of the monarchy towards a fully representative democracy. The Taimi Media Network described it as "Tonga’s first democratically elected Parliament".

The Democratic Party of the Friendly Islands, founded in September 2010 specifically to fight the election and led by veteran pro-democracy campaigner 'Akilisi Pohiva, secured the largest number of seats, with 12 out of the seventeen "people's representative" seats.

Background

Heading to political reforms 
Prior to these elections, members of Tonga's Legislative Assembly (the Fale Alea) were primarily appointed by the monarch, who also selected the prime minister and the cabinet. Only nine of the 30 seats were popularly elected, and another nine were held by members of the aristocracy.

In April 2010 the Legislative Assembly enacted a package of political reforms, increasing the number of people's representatives from nine to seventeen, with ten seats for Tongatapu, three for Vavaʻu, two for Haʻapai and one each for Niuas and ʻEua. All of the seats are single-seat constituencies, as opposed to the multi-member constituencies used before. These changes mean that now 17 of 26 representatives (65.4%) will be directly elected, up from 9 of 30 (30.0%). The noble aristocracy will still select its nine representatives, while all remaining seats, which were previously appointed by the monarch, will be abolished.

While the cabinet and the prime minister were previously selected by the monarch, this time, the elected parliamentarians will vote for a prime minister.

The changes come in the wake of violent pro-democracy demonstrations in November 2006, in which eight people were killed and much of the business district of Tongatapu destroyed as people protested against the slow movement toward political reform. The changes have been fully supported by the king. One of the candidates, Sione Fonua, said, "The king saw the signs that people wanted change and, to his credit, he has allowed that to happen".

Impact on the monarchy 
Tonga is a very traditional society, and the role of the monarchy is extremely important.

In response to the question of the impact the new legislation would have on his role, the King stated that while not officially reducing his powers, the reforms meant that he was now limited in his capacity to exercise these powers:

Analysts, however, have said they are not yet certain what effective changes the political shift would bring. The king retains the power of veto over certain laws, as well as the power to dismiss the government.

Election

People's representatives
Voter registration closed on 31 August, with approximately 42,000 voters registering. In November 2010, the Women's and Children's Crisis Centre expressed concern that up to 40% of eligible voters could have failed to register.

Candidates were registered on 21 and 22 October, with 147 candidates contesting the 17 constituencies. The Tongatapu 6 and 9 constituencies were the most heavily contested, with 15 candidates each, while Ha'apai 13, 'Eua 11 and Niuas 17 had only three candidates each. Ten candidates were women. Only three of the incumbent Cabinet contested the elections.

Candidates were required to pay a P400 (Tonga-pa'anga) registration fee (equivalent to $215 US or €165) and present the signatures of 50 eligible voters in support of their candidacy.
The suffering economy was seen as the most significant priority for the campaigners. According to the World Bank, up to 40% of Tongans live on or below the poverty line. In addition, the International Monetary Fund claims that Tonga's national debt is substantial and that the island nation is at high risk of not being able to pay them.

In an address to the nation before polling stations opened, the King described the vote as "the greatest and most historic day for our kingdom". He went on to say, "You will choose your representative to the parliament and, thus, the first elected government in our country's long history."

Nobles' representatives
Elections to the nobles' seats was reformed, through the Representatives Electoral Regulations Act 2010. Each member of the nobility was henceforth only allowed to cast a vote in the constituency containing lands to which his title of nobility was attached. The four constituencies were:
 a joint constituency for Tongatapu & ʻEua, corresponding to fourteen hereditary titles (thirteen in Tongatapu and one, Lasike, in ʻEua), and electing four representatives;
 the constituency of Vavaʻu, corresponding to eight hereditary titles and electing two representatives;
 the constituency of Haʻapai, corresponding to seven hereditary titles and electing two representatives;
 the constituency of the Niuas, corresponding to four hereditary titles and electing one representative.

There were two nobles who held two titles each: Prince ʻAhoʻeitu ʻUnuakiʻotonga Tukuʻaho held the titles of Tupoutoʻa (in Haʻapai) and Lavaka (in Tongatapu), while Lord Kalaniuvalu of Tongatapu was jointly Lord Fotofili of the Niuas. It is not clear whether this enabled these two men to cast two ballots. In addition, there were three unattributed titles: Maʻatu in the Niuas, and ʻAhomeʻe and Fohe in Tongatapu. Also, King Tupou V had, since 2008, instituted the unprecedented title of "Law Lords" for three men (Ramsay Robertson Dalgety, Tevita Poasi Tupou and Taniela Tufui), conferring upon them a non-hereditary life title which entitled them to vote in a nobles' constituency of their choosing, but not to be elected. Dalgety and Tupou chose to vote in Tongatapu, and Tufui in Haʻapai. Consequently, there were twelve to fourteen potential voters in Tongatapu (depending on where Prince Tukuʻaho and Lord Kalaniuvalu chose to vote), eight in Vavaʻu, seven or eight in Haʻapai, and two or three in the Niuas.

Results
According to election officials, approximately 89% of the 42,000 registered voters cast ballots. A delegation of fourteen observers from Australia and New Zealand were in Tonga to observe the election. Reports said they were pleased at the way the election had been managed.

The outcome of the election resulted in a plurality of seats for the Democratic Party of the Friendly Islands, who won 12 out of the 17 "people's representative" seats, with only some 29% of the votes (because of the First Past the Post voting system being used).

Once the results were finalised, the newly elected representatives selected a prime minister. Tongans, who have traditionally looked to the nobility for leadership, had widely expected it to be a nobleman. After their election, however, the nobles' representatives announced that they would support a commoner for prime minister but ultimately decided to support Lord Tu'ivakano.

People's representatives

Noble representatives

The nobles' representatives are:

Government formation

Following the election, the DPFI secured the support of one independent and was seeking the support of two others – 'Aisake Valu Eke and Sunia Fili – by offering them cabinet posts. Following concerns the noble representatives would support one of the independents for Prime Minister, the DPFI decided to hold a public rally to build public support.

The formal process of electing a Prime Minister will begin after the final election results are formally notified, with the appointment of an interim Speaker and a call for nominations. MPs will then vote by secret ballot in one or more rounds, until a candidate is elected.

On 3 December 2010 the King appointed Lord Tupou as interim Speaker.

The three MPs from Vava'u are considered to be pro-monarchy.

Sosefo Fe’aomoeata Vakata reportedly left the DPFI and became an independent, and was likely to support the nobles together with the five independent MPs, resulting in a noble-led government. He joined a bloc of 15 members, including all nine noble representatives and five other people's representatives, to jointly nominate a Prime Minister.

The DPFI rejected these claims and stated it still expects to form the government. A vote was scheduled for 17 December, but then delayed to 20 December.

On 15 December 2010, DPFI MP 'Isileli Pulu claimed that the DPFI had the support of 14 of the 17 popularly elected MPs and of a few nobles, 18 MPs in total.

On 20 December 2010 Samuela 'Akilisi Pohiva and Siale'ataonga Tu'ivakano were nominated for Prime Minister. The election was postponed to 21 December 2010. Tu'ivakano was elected by 14 votes to 12.

On 31 December Tu'ivakano named his cabinet, which included six people's representatives, three nobles, and two commoners appointed from outside Parliament.

References

External links
Full candidate list

Tonga
Elections in Tonga
2010 in Tonga
November 2010 events in Oceania